Gorsky (masculine) or Gorskaya (feminine) is a Russian surname. Notable people with the surname include:

Alexander Alexeyevich Gorsky (1871–1924), Russian ballet dancer and choreographer
Alexander Vasilyevich Gorsky (1812–1875), Russian historian
Anatoly Gorsky (c. 1907–1980), Soviet espionage agent
Doreen Gorsky (1912–2001), English politician
Eugene Gorsky (1980-present), American guitarist 
Ivan Gorsky (1893–1975), Soviet geologist and paleontologist
Vladimir Gorsky (1953-2008), Russian-American painter
Vyacheslav Gorsky (born 1953), Russian pianist
Yana Gorskaya (born 1977), Russian film editor

See also
Górski, Polish surname
Sergey Prokudin-Gorsky (1863–1944), Russian photographer

Russian-language surnames